William E. Peterson (born February 2, 1936) is an American politician and educator who served as a member of the Illinois Senate from 1993 to 2009. He had also served as the Assistant Minority Leader.

Peterson previously served in the Illinois House of Representatives from 1983 to 1993. Peterson had announced that he would not seek reelection in 2008. Republican candidate Dan Duffy of Lake Barrington defeated Bill Gentes, the mayor of Round Lake, in the November 4, 2008 election.

Peterson is the longtime Supervisor for Vernon Township in Lake County, Illinois.

Committee responsibilities: Senate Committee of all; Insurance; Human Services; Local Government; Housing and Community Affairs (Minority Spokesperson); Executive; Labor.
(note He is no longer apart of the General Assembly He served the 95th  26th District

References

1936 births
21st-century American politicians
Republican Party Illinois state senators
Living people
Republican Party members of the Illinois House of Representatives